Sandra 'Sandi' Zakoske is a former Hong Kong international lawn and indoor bowler.

Zakoske won a silver medal in the triples at the 1985 World Outdoor Bowls Championship in Melbourne with Rae O'Donnell and Helen Wong. She also won a triples medal at the 1988 World Outdoor Bowls Championship in Auckland after securing a bronze medal with O'Donnell and Naty Rozario.

She was national champion in 1977.

References

Hong Kong female bowls players
Living people
Date of birth missing (living people)
Year of birth missing (living people)